Plée is a French surname. Notable people with the surname include:

Auguste Plée (1787–1825), French botanist
Henry Plée (1923–2014), French martial artist

See also
Plea

French-language surnames